Reiche is a family name of German origin: 

 Daniel Reiche, a German soccer player.
 Dietlof Reiche, a German writer.
 Elena Reiche, a German pentathlete.
 Fritz Reiche, a German physics.
 Gottfried Reiche, a German musician.
 Karl Friedrich Reiche, a German botanist.
 Katherina Reiche, a German politician.
 Louis Jérôme Reiche, a French merchant, manufacturer and entomologist.
 Maria Reiche, a German mathematician and archaeologist.
 Nora Reiche, a German handball player.
 Paul Reiche III, an American game developer.
 Reimut Reiche, a German sociologist.
 Rüdiger Reiche, a German rower.
 Steffen Reiche, a German politician. 
 Wolfgang Reiche, founder of Dachgeber